The following is a list of the busiest airports in Argentina by passengers traffic. For each airport, the lists cite the principal city associated with the airport, not (necessarily) the municipality where the airport is physically located.

In graph

2022

Argentina's 15 busiest airports by passenger traffic 2022

2021

Argentina's 15 busiest airports by passenger traffic 2021

2020

Argentina's 15 busiest airports by passenger traffic 2020

2019

Argentina's 15 busiest airports by passenger traffic 2019

2018

Argentina's 15 busiest airports by passenger traffic 2018

2017

Argentina's 15 busiest airports by passenger traffic 2017 

Notes:
: Some of the airports were closed for reparations during 2017, such as TUC and SFN, while others absorbed the traffic from them, such as RHD and PRA.

Reference 

Argentina
Lists
Airports
Airports